The Istriot language is a Romance language of the Italo-Dalmatian branch spoken by about 400 people in the southwestern part of the Istrian peninsula in Croatia, particularly in Rovinj and Vodnjan. It should not be confused with the Istrian dialect of the Venetian language or the more distantly related Eastern Romance Istro-Romanian.

Classification

Istriot is a Romance language currently only found in Istria. 
Its classification has remained mostly unclear, various proposals for its affinity exist:

 as being related to the Ladin populations of the Alps. According to the Italian linguist Matteo Bartoli, the Ladin area used to extend – until the year 1000 AD – from southern Istria to Friuli and eastern Switzerland.

 as an independent Northern Italian language, belonging neither to the Venetian language nor to the Gallo-Italic group (opinion shared by linguists Tullio De Mauro and Maurizio Dardano);
 as a variety of the Rhaeto-Romance languages by the Istriot Antonio Ive
 as an independent language of the Italo-Dalmatian group
 as an autochthonous Romance language heavily influenced by Venetian, Friulian and Slavic superstrates by Mirko Deanović
 In 2017 it was classified by the Max Planck Institute for the Science of Human History with the Dalmatian language in the Dalmatian Romance subgroup,

When Istria was a region of the Kingdom of Italy, Istriot was considered by the authorities as a subdialect of Venetian.

Historically, its speakers never referred to it as "Istriot"; it had six names after the six towns where it was spoken. In Vodnjan it was named "Bumbaro", in Bale "Valìʃe", in Rovinj "Ruvignìʃ", in Šišan "Siʃanìʃ", in Fažana "Faʃanìʃ" and in Galižana "Galiʃaneʃ". The term Istriot was coined by the 19th-century Italian linguist Graziadio Isaia Ascoli.

This language is still spoken by some people in the Istriot communities in Fertilia and Maristella, in Sardinia.

There are about 400 speakers left, making it an endangered language.

Vocabulary 
Below is a comparison of Istriot with several closely related Romance languages and Latin:

Phonology 
The phonology of the Istriot language:

Consonants 

 Sounds  can also be noted as  among different dialects.
  occurs as a result of a nasal consonant preceding a velar stop.
  can occur as a result of Italian loanwords.

Vowels

Orthography 
The Istriot alphabet is the following:

Example

This is a poem called "Grièbani" by Ligio Zanini in the dialect of Rovinj-Rovigno.

See also
Istrian Italians
Julian March
Dalmatian language
Wikisource:Istriot

Notes

External links

Istriot Language Map (distribution)

Languages of Croatia
Italo-Dalmatian languages
Endangered Romance languages
Italians of Croatia
Subject–verb–object languages